Joseph Edet Akinwale Wey (6 March 1918 – 12 December 1991) was a Nigerian Navy Vice Admiral who served as head of the Nigerian Navy (i.e. Chief of Naval Staff), acting foreign minister, and chief of staff of the Supreme Headquarters, making him the de facto vice president of Nigeria during Yakubu Gowon's regime.

Early life 
Born in Calabar in March 1918 to a Yoruba father who was from Lagos and an Efik mother, Admiral Wey had his early education in Calabar, Cross River State and at Methodist School, Ikot Ekpene in present Akwa Ibom State; and further education in Lagos.

Naval career 
He joined the Marine Department as a cadet and engineer in training around 1940.  At the end of his training in 1945, he served in all sea-going vessels in the Marine Department. When the Navy was established in 1956, he was transferred to the Navy as a sub-lieutenant.  In 1962, he was appointed as the commanding officer of base and naval officer in charge of Apapa, Lagos.  In 1966, he was appointed as the Federal Commissioner of Establishment and he became a member of the federal Executive Council.  He was promoted to various ranks and to the final rank of vice-admiral.

Retirement and death 
He was retired in 1975 following the successful coup that brought Murtala Mohammed to power, replacing the military government of General Yakubu Gowon. He died 12 December 1991.

Military ranks

References

1918 births
Nigerian Navy admirals
Vice presidents of Nigeria
Yoruba military personnel
Yoruba politicians
People from Calabar
20th-century Nigerian politicians
Ibibio people
Efik people
1991 deaths
People from colonial Nigeria
Chiefs of Naval Staff (Nigeria)